Chinyelu Susan Onwurah  (born 12 April 1965) is a British Labour Party politician who has served as the Member of Parliament for Newcastle upon Tyne Central since 2010.

She was shadow minister for Industrial Strategy, Science and Innovation under Labour leader Jeremy Corbyn from October 2016 until 9 April 2020, when she was appointed as shadow minister for  Science, Research & Digital by Keir Starmer.

Early life
Onwurah's mother was from Newcastle. Her father, from Nigeria, was working as a dentist while he studied at Newcastle University Medical School when they met and married in the 1950s.

Onwurah was born in Wallsend, North Tyneside. While she was still in her infancy the family moved to Awka, Nigeria in 1965. Just two years later the Biafra War broke out, bringing famine with it, forcing her mother to bring the children back to Tyneside, while her father stayed there in the Biafran army.

Onwurah attended Kenton School in Newcastle and graduated from Imperial College London in 1987 with a degree in electrical engineering. She worked in hardware and software development, product management, market development and strategy for a variety of mainly private sector companies in a number of different countries – the UK, France, the United States, Nigeria and Denmark while studying for an MBA at Manchester Business School.

Prior to entering Parliament, Onwurah was Head of Telecoms Technology at Ofcom, with a focus on broadband provision.

Political career

Before entering Parliament, Onwurah was active in the Anti-Apartheid Movement. She spent many years on its National Executive, and that of its successor organisation, ACTSA: Action for Southern Africa. She also joined the Advisory Board of the Open University Business School.

Parliamentary career 
Onwurah was elected as the Member of Parliament (MP) for Newcastle upon Tyne Central at the 2010 general election with a majority of 7,466. She succeeded the previous Labour MP Jim Cousins, who had decided to step down after 23 years. She described Parliament as a "culture shock" but also said that compared with her engineering background "parliament is the most diverse working environment I've ever been in, the most gender balanced".

Onwurah supported Ed Miliband in the 2010 Labour Party leadership election. Miliband appointed Onwurah as a junior shadow minister for Business, Innovation and Skills on 10 October 2010. 

In January 2013, Onwurah was given a new "wide-ranging role" as a Shadow Minister for the Cabinet Office, focusing on "cyber security, social entrepreneurship and open government." Departing from the post in September 2015, she was succeeded by Louise Haigh.

Campaigning on gender issues 
In February 2014, Onwurah spoke in a parliamentary debate called at her initiative on the topic of gender-specific toy marketing. She also lent her support to the campaign Let Toys Be Toys. In her speech to the House of Commons, she said:"Before entering Parliament, I spent two decades as a professional engineer, working across three continents. Regardless of where I was or the size of the company, it was always a predominantly male, or indeed all-male, environment, but it is only when I walk into a toy shop that I feel I am really experiencing gender segregation."
She later told Kira Cochrane of The Guardian that she believes the limiting of children by gender stereotypes is a serious economic issue, with the proportion of female students on engineering degree courses having fallen from 12% to 8% in the thirty years since she had started studying for one herself. Referring to a shortage of engineers and the UK having "the lowest proportion in Europe of women who are professional engineers" she said "toys are so important and formative, and for me this is about the jobs of the future, about what happens in 10 or 15 years' time. We can't go on with a segregated society."

Post-2015 

In the 2015 Labour Party leadership election, Onwurah announced her support for Andy Burnham, having originally nominated Jeremy Corbyn to "broaden the debate". Onwurah is the only engineer in the post-2015 Parliamentary Labour Party..

After Jeremy Corbyn won the leadership election of the Labour party in September 2015, Onwurah was made a Shadow Minister for Business, Innovation and Skills, as well as a Shadow Minister for Culture, Media and Sport.

Racial discrimination controversy 
In the January 2016 reshuffle, Onwurah's frontbench role for culture and the digital economy was briefly split between herself and Thangam Debbonaire. According to Onwurah, Corbyn did not communicate this change to either MP directly or tell Debbonaire when he reversed his decision, leaving them in limbo as to their precise responsibilities. Moreover, he refused requests for clarification. A spokesman for Corbyn's office, disputing the lack of "negotiation" in January, said "at no point was anyone sacked. We regret that Chi feels she was singled out, but this was clearly not the case. Chi Onwurah's comments relate to a discussion about the delineation of shadow cabinet roles last January, as is not uncommon in both shadow cabinets and cabinets."

Onwurah noted that the confusion affected two of the ethnic minority, female MPs (out of a 5% total), and argued that employment law required private sector managers to be considerably more sensitive and responsive in handling comparable situations. She stated: "If this had been any of my previous employers in the public and private sectors, Jeremy might well have found himself before an industrial tribunal for constructive dismissal, probably with racial discrimination thrown in". Onwurah later wrote that "I made no accusation of racism against Jeremy", after claims had been made of her "playing the race card".

2016 Labour leadership election 
Onwurah backed Owen Smith in the 2016 Labour leadership election, but remained a Labour frontbencher. In August 2016, during the Labour leadership campaign she publicly supported Owen Smith's calls for a second referendum on the UK's EU membership.

2017 and 2019 general elections 

Onwurah retained her seat at the 2017 general election, increasing Labour's share of the vote to 65%. Newcastle Central was the first constituency to declare a result at the general election that year.

She was re-elected at the 2019 general election, and again, Newcastle Central was the first seat in the United Kingdom to be declared. Her share of the vote fell to 57.6%, representing a majority of 12,278 votes with a swing of just under 4% to the Conservatives, which was better than the national swing, particularly in North East England. The seat is currently the second safest Labour seat in the North East after the adjoining Newcastle upon Tyne East.

Personal life
Onwurah supports Newcastle United FC.

Awards and honours
In 2018, Onwurah was added to the Computer Weekly "Most Influential Women in UK IT" Hall of Fame alongside Hannah Dee, Sarah Wood and Sherry Coutu.

In 2020 she was made an Honorary Fellow of the British Science Association.

References

External links

Chi Onwurah talk at the University of Edinburgh for the Global Challenges Lab/Practical Action, Spring 2016

1965 births
Living people
21st-century British women politicians
Alumni of Imperial College London
Alumni of the University of Manchester
Black British MPs
Black British women politicians
English people of Igbo descent
Female members of the Parliament of the United Kingdom for English constituencies
Labour Party (UK) MPs for English constituencies
People from Wallsend
Politicians from Tyne and Wear
UK MPs 2010–2015
UK MPs 2015–2017
UK MPs 2017–2019
UK MPs 2019–present
British women engineers
English electrical engineers